Al-Shallal Theme Park is located in Jeddah, Saudi Arabia. The park is often referred to as "Fakieh Poultry Farms", which is the name of the owners of the park. The park officially opened on June 28, 2005.  In 2001, Fakieh Poultry Farms ranked as the 34th largest company in Saudi Arabia with over $480 million in assets and over 6000 employees.

History

The theme park officially opened on June 28, 2005. The theme park in Jeddah is one of a few popular amusement parks in the Middle East to have hundreds of families who visit the city for vacations. The two story entertainment building at the center of the Park features an ice skating rink and a themed area which is a favorite haunt of the younger visitors. The park reflects a jungle complete with life-size figures of animals, and light and sound effects. The Amazon log flume ride is spread over an area of 1800 square meters and consists of a lagoon with a 15-meter high waterfall. The entertainment building  has several party rooms and an arcade. The party rooms can be reserved by the public for birthday parties and private gatherings. There are seven restaurants housed in the entertainment building. The park has retail outlets that feature souvenirs and soft toys. Apart from the Amazon Theme area there is a European village themed area and the Far East village area. These have world class restaurants that serve a wide array of seafood. The park also has a building for indoor parking which can accommodate 300 cars while there is an open air parking facility which has a capacity of 300 cars as well.

Rides

Roller coasters

Attractions

References

External links
Official website

Amusement parks in Saudi Arabia
Tourist attractions in Jeddah
Buildings and structures in Jeddah